Ranipettai is a town in Tamil Nadu, India. Ranipet (lit. Queen's colony) is an industrial hub. It is a major industrial town located on NH 4 Chennai-Bangalore highway. This suburb is on the northern bank of the Palar river and had a population of 377,000 as of 2022.

History
Ranipet was built around the year 1771 by Sadut-ulla-khan, the Nawab of Carnatic, in honor of the youthful widow of Desingh Raja of Gingee, who committed Sati upon her husband's death. Out of respect for Desingh Raja's valour and his wife's devotion, the Nawab formed a new village opposite to Arcot on the Northern bank of Palar river and named it Ranipet.

The town gained importance since the establishment of European cantonment. It is supposed to contain 9 lakhs of trees and hence the name "Navlakh Bagh". South India's first rail operation was operated between Royapuram to Ranipet.

On August 15, 2019, Ranipet became the district headquarters for the Ranipet district after announcement of the newly created district.

On October 21, 2021, Ranipet was added to Chennai.

Demographics

According to 2011 census, Ranipet had a population of 50,764 with a sex-ratio of 1,091 females for every 1,000 males, much above the national average of 929. A total of 5,124 were under the age of six, constituting 2,564 males and 2,560 females. Scheduled Castes and Scheduled Tribes accounted for 34.3% and .04% of the population respectively. The average literacy of the town was 81.%, compared to the national average of 72.99%. The town had a total of 12275 households. There were a total of 18,243 workers, comprising 45 cultivators, 100 main agricultural labourers, 373 in house hold industries, 16,095 other workers, 1,630 marginal workers, 15 marginal cultivators, 29 marginal agricultural labourers, 95 marginal workers in household industries and 1,491 other marginal workers. As per the religious census of 2011, Ranipet had 76.42% Hindus, 15.19% Muslims, 8.02% Christians, 0.01% Sikhs, 0.04% Buddhists, 0.27% Jains, 0.03% following other religions and 0.02% following no religion or did not indicate any religious preference.

Ranipet is 100 km from Chennai, by road. Walajah Road Railway Station is the nearest railhead, while the nearest railway junction is Katpadi Jn, 17 km from Ranipet. The nearest airport is Chennai International Airport 100 km from Ranipet..

Ranipet Municipality
Ranipet Municipality was constituted on 01.04.1959 as per G.O.MS No. 724 RDLA dt.01.04.1959. It was upgraded as IInd Grade with effect from 05.10.1978, and then it has upgraded to Ist Grade Municipality with effect from 22.05.1998. Subsequently, Ranipet Municipality was upgraded as Selection Grade Municipality.

Industry

There are a number of large- and medium-scale leather industries making both finished leather and leather articles such as shoes and garments for export. There are other small-scale industries in Ranipet, mostly engaged in chemical, leather and tool making. These industries are the major lifeline for the town.

One of the oldest companies in Ranipet that was formed in the early 19th century is EID Parry, named after Thomas Parry, who sailed to India and started a merchant business in India. The branch of EID Parry located in Ranipet is one of the largest ceramic plants in South India. In addition to Ceramics, the company also produces fertilizers in this location sold to farmers around the country. EID Parry also produces confectioneries in other locations.

After the acquisition of the company Johnson & Pedder, EID Parry produced Ballerina ceramic designs in India. Most residents, several decades ago, worked for EID Parry before the expansion of Sipcot Industrial complex and arrival of Central Government-aided engineering unit such as BHEL.

World's first diesel tractor manufacturing Italian company SAME DEUTZ-FAHR India (P) limited (SDFI) located at Sipcot industrial complex. They manufacture tractors and engines for export and domestic market, ranging from 35 hp to 80 hp tractor with advanced technology.

The French company Plastic Omnium and world No.1 fuel systems manufacturer established a factory in 2010 for the purpose of delivering fuel tank systems to local automobile manufacturers such as Toyota and Hyundai.

The town is home to the Boiler Auxiliaries Plant of Bharat Heavy Electricals Limited (BHEL), a major Central Government owned enterprise., Bavina Cars is planning to set up a manufacturing plant at a cost of  300 crores.

Ranipet also has about 500 small and large scale engineering units catering mainly to BHEL. Ranipet is the second largest fabrication cluster in India. Arcelor-Mittal's Dhamm processing Ltd. has invested more than 100 crores.

Thirumalai Chemicals Ltd. a large Petrochemical unit is one of the largest manufacturers of Phthalic Anhydride and Food Acidulants in Asia, and employs around 2000 people in and around Ranipet.

Kostal India Automotive German based electric switches manufacturing company. Supplies to major automobile OEM Ford, TATA and others.

Leathers Industries 

Ranipet was once glorified as fast developing industrial zone, but faced economic depression. Ranipet indirectly suffered from Great Recession 2008 as leather business and exports cater to Western Developed nations. A special economic zone is established at Nellikuppam, a suburb of Ranipet.

Ranipet houses AH Group And KH Group of companies. Nearly 400 small and medium leather units are placed in Ranipet.
BHEL Ranipet Plant is manufacturing Boiler Auxiliary instruments such as, ESP, Fans, Gate & Dampers, FGD etc. to support Thermal Power Plant.

Hospitals
The Scudder Memorial Hospital provides nursing to many outpatients. This hospital was started around 1866 by Dr. Silas Downer Scudder. It is a big hospital that was started well before CMCH was commissioned in Vellore.

Research Institutes

Institute of Veterinary Preventive Medicine
The Institute originally known as Serum Institute was established at Madras (present day Chennai) in 1932 to produce anti-rinderpest serum and bull virus to combat rinderpest which was rampant then, posing serious threat to the livestock population. In 1942, the institute was shifted to Coimbatore Agricultural College Estate as an emergency measure due to World War –II. The Campus with an  area used to be a meat dehydration plant of the army and was acquired by the State Government from the Army under post war construction scheme. The institute has got vast development over 73 years and it's now engaged in the production of various Vaccines, (Bacterial and Viral Vaccines) against various diseases of livestock and poultry, diagnostic reagents and Pharmaceutical products for treatment of ailing animals. In addition, the Institute extends disease investigation service to the field veterinarians.

Politics
R.Gandhi is the sitting MLA of DMK.
Ranipet assembly constituency is part of Arakkonam (Lok Sabha constituency).

Food
Across the Palar river, a neighbouring town named Arcot, famous for markets of vegetables, Kichili samba rice, sweets, agri products, electrical and jhat market. Arcot is even famous for makkan beda, a sweet prepared right from nawab period. Yet another sweet called malai gaja is also famous from nawab period. Every Friday and Sunday, People visit Weekly Market where Farmers directly sell vegetables, fruits and other eatables to people near Ranipet new bus stand (sandha maidanam) and Sipcot respectively. Friday market is also a place were the Hens, Goats, Ox and cows are sold in a traditional way.

References

Cities and towns in Ranipet district